The  is an indigenous Japanese Christian movement which was founded by Uchimura Kanzō in 1901. Many of his disciples have likewise been well-known intellectual figures. Today it is believed that 35,000 people belong to the movement in Japan, Taiwan, and Korea.

About
The complete works of Uchimura Kanzō consist of some 50 volumes: of which, 17 are primarily biblical studies, 25 are volumes of theological works, and 8 are volumes of diaries and correspondence.

During the lifetime of Uchimura Kanzō, a graduate of Amherst College, the non-church movement took several organizational forms. His direct disciples were essentially paying members of his private school. As subscribers to his magazine grew, supporters outside Tokyo sought some ongoing relationship with other non-church members. Uchimura organized the Kyōyukai (or literally, "Meeting of Friends in Faith") in 1905, with 14 branches and 119 members. The purpose of this organization was defined in the following profession of faith:

We who believe in God and his Only Son whom he sent (into the world), uniting together, form the Kyōyukai. With the help of God the Father we shall help our comrades and live lives that are in harmony with His Sovereign Will.

People of the non-church movement
Tadao Yanaihara
Masato Koizumi
Masao Sekine
Ichiro Ohga

See also

Japanese new religions
Dōkai - The Society of the Way

References

Further reading
Asahi article on Mukyokai.
Scholarly article mentioning Mukyokai.

Christian organizations established in 1901
Christian denominations founded in Japan
Christian denominations established in the 20th century
Christian new religious movements
World Christianity